Larry Fitzpatrick (born August 17, 1976) is a former American football defensive lineman who played two seasons with the Hamilton Tiger-Cats of the Canadian Football League. He played college football at Illinois State University and attended Willow Run High School in Ypsilanti, Michigan. He was also a member of the Baltimore Ravens, Rhein Fire and Chicago Enforcers.

References

External links
Just Sports Stats

Living people
1976 births
Players of American football from Detroit
American football defensive linemen
Canadian football defensive linemen
Illinois State Redbirds football players
Rhein Fire players
Chicago Enforcers players
Hamilton Tiger-Cats players
Sportspeople from Ypsilanti, Michigan